The 2007 Nigerian Senate election in Enugu State was held on 21 April 2007, to elect members of the Nigerian Senate to represent Enugu State. Chimaroke Nnamani representing Enugu East, Ayogu Eze representing Enugu North and Ike Ekweremadu representing Enugu West all won on the platform of the Peoples Democratic Party.

Overview

Summary

Results

Enugu East 
The election was won by Chimaroke Nnamani of the Peoples Democratic Party.

Enugu North 
The election was won by Ayogu Eze of the Peoples Democratic Party.

Enugu West 
The election was won by Ike Ekweremadu of the Peoples Democratic Party.

References 

April 2007 events in Nigeria
Enugu State Senate elections
Enu